Esplanade Gambetta is a plaza located in the center of the Tunisian capital, Tunis. It is named after the French lawyer and politician Léon Gambetta.

Streets in Tunis